The National Youth League (NYL), was an Australian national soccer league run in parallel to the National Soccer League (NSL) between 1984 and 2004. The aim of the league was to provide a pathway for young players to play regular high-level football, and allow reserve players from senior NSL teams to remain match fit. The league was founded in 1981, alongside the simultaneous expansion of the senior competition. The league later followed the NSL's move to summer competition during the switch to summer play in 1989.

The competition was split into Northern and Southern divisions, with the winners of each division playing off in a grand final to decide the national champion. The Southern division included teams mostly from Victoria, but also sides from South Australia. The Northern division contained teams from the Australian Capital Territory, New South Wales and Queensland. Teams were drawn from NSL clubs, state league clubs, regional representative sides as well as the programs of the various state-run sports institutes, such as the Australian Institute of Sport's Football Program. The competition ceased operation in 2004, at the same time the NSL ended. While the A-League replaced the NSL in 2005, after a season's recess, the NYL was not succeeded by the A-League National Youth League until 2008.

Champions

Performance by team

See also
 National Soccer League
 A-League Youth

Notes

References
 Roy Hay, 'The National Youth League 1984-2004', Goal Weekly, March 2008
 

National Soccer League (Australia)
Defunct soccer leagues in Australia
Youth football leagues
Youth soccer in Australia